Aloo gosht (Alu göshto,  Alu güs) is a meat curry,  and is a popular dish in North Indian, Pakistani, and Bangladeshi cuisine. It consists of potatoes (aloo) cooked with meat (gosht), usually lamb or mutton or beef, in a stew-like shorba gravy. It may be considered a curry, stew, or shorba depending on the way the dish is prepared, the types of spices used and what country or particular region it was made in. The dish can be served and eaten with plain rice or with bread such as roti, paratha or naan.

History
It is a favorite and common dish in India and Pakistan, Indian and Bangladeshi meals; and is commonly consumed as a comfort food in the Indian subcontinent.

Preparation
There are various methods of cooking aloo gosht. Generally, the preparation method involves simmering lamb or beef pieces and potatoes over medium heat, with various spices.

Lamb or beef meat is cut into chunks and placed into a stew pot over heat. Chicken may be used as an alternative to lamb or beef. Tomatoes, along with cinnamon, bay leaves, ginger, garlic, red chili powder, cumin seeds, fried onions, black cardamom, garam masala and cooking oil are added and stirred. Potatoes and salt are mixed in. Water is added, in a proportion that is enough to cover the meat, and brought to the boil. The aloo gosht is covered and left to simmer until the meat becomes tender. Once ready, it may be garnished with chopped coriander leaves and served hot.

See also

 Aloo gobi
 List of lamb dishes
 Pakistani meat dishes
 Nikujaga
 Irish stew

References

Muhajir cuisine
North Indian cuisine
Pakistani curries
Pakistani meat dishes
Pashtun cuisine
Potato dishes
Punjabi cuisine
Bengali cuisine
Bangladeshi cuisine
Kashmiri cuisine
Lamb dishes
Indian chicken dishes
Meat and potatoes dishes
Pakistani cuisine
Beef dishes